Tinsley Rucker Ginn (September 26, 1891 – August 30, 1931) was a Major League Baseball outfielder who played for one season. He played with the Cleveland Naps for two games during the 1914 season. He attended the University of Georgia.

External links

1891 births
1931 deaths
Major League Baseball outfielders
Cleveland Naps players
Baseball players from Georgia (U.S. state)
University of Georgia alumni